The British Ornithologists' Union checklists are a series of books published by the British Ornithologists' Union (BOU) and (from 2003) jointly with the British Ornithologists' Club (BOC) documenting the status of bird in various regions of the world. Each volume contains a systematic list of bird species recorded in the area. In many cases the BOU checklist was the first such work for the country in question.

The Books 

Volumes produced to date (year of publication in brackets) are:

 1. The Birds of Libya by G. Bundy
 2. The Birds of Zanzibar and Pemba by R. H. Pakenham
 3. The Birds of The Gambia (2nd edition, 1991) by M. E. J. Gore
 4. The Birds of Nigeria (2nd edition, 1994) by J. Helgood, J. B. Heigham, Amberley M. Moore, Anne N. Nason, R. E. Sharland and N. J. Skinner
 5. The Birds of the Serengeti National Park, Tanzania by D. Schmidl
 6. The Birds of Cyprus (2nd Edition, 1992) by P. R. Flint and P. F. Stewart
 7. The Birds of Wallacea (1986) by C. M. N. White and M. D. Bruce
 8. The Birds of the South Bahamas (1987) by D. W. Buden
 9. The Birds of Ghana by L. G. Grimes
 10. The Birds of Sumatra (1988) by J. G. van Marle and Karel H Voous
 11. The Birds of Sicily (1989) by Carmelo Iapichino and Bruno Massa
 12. The Birds of the Philippines (1991) by E. C. Dickinson, R. S. Kennedy and K. C. Parkes
 13. The Birds of the Cape Verde Islands (1995) by C. J. Hazevoet
 14. The Birds of Togo (1996) by Robert A. Cheke and J. Frank Walsh
 15. The Birds of St Lucia (1997) by Allan R. Keith
 16. The Birds of St Helena (1998) by Beau Rowlands et al.
 17. The Birds of Corsica (1999) by J-C. Thibault and G. Bonaccorsi
 18. The Birds of Angola (2000) by W. R. J. Dean
 19. The Birds of the Cayman Islands (2000) by Patricia E. Bradley
 20. The Birds of Hispaniola (2003) by Allan R. Keith, James W. Wiley, Steven C. Latta and José A. Ottenwalder
 21. The Birds of Morocco (2003) by Michel Thévenot, Rae Vernon and Patrick Bergier
 22. The Birds of the Gulf of Guinea (2006) by Alan Tye and Peter Jones
 23. The Birds of the Borneo (2008) by Clive F. Mann
 24. The Birds of the Barbados (2009) by P.A. Buckley, Edward B. Massiah, Maurice B. Hutt, Francine G. Buckley and Hazel F. Hutt

External links
 BOU website
 BOC website

British Ornithologists' Union
Ornithological checklists